Patsy Widakuswara is a radio and broadcast journalist in the United States who covers the White House and U.S. politics. She is the White House Bureau Chief of Voice of America. She became part of a controversy during the administration of Donald Trump in 2021 when she was removed from the White House beat after questioning Secretary of State Mike Pompeo. The move called into question the independence of Voice of America as a government-owned media outlet.

Education 
Widakuswara studied International Relations at the University of Indonesia and completed a master's in Journalism from Goldsmiths College, University of London.

Career 

Widakuswara's has worked in broadcasting and radio in Indonesia, the United Kingdom, and the United States for since the 1990s. She began working at Voice of America (VOA) in 2003 as a producer and on-air reporter for the Indonesian Service.

In early 2021, Widakuswara covered the Trump administration for VOA. On January 11, 2021, after VOA news director Robert R. Reilly interviewed Pompeo but did not allow reporters to ask questions, Widakuswara asked Pompeo several questions as he left the building. Reilly responded she "obviously [didn't] know how to behave," and that "she wasn't 'authorized' to be there to ask questions." She was hours later removed from the prestigious White House beat and then reassigned to VOA Indonesian service.

The Coalition For Women In Journalism issued a statement condemning the reassignment. The White House Press Association also condemned Widakuswara's removal from the White House beat and leaders of the U.S. House Foreign Affairs Committee issued a press release stating they asked for more information from the U.S. Agency for Global Media (USAGM) and Voice of America, and Chairman Gregory Meeks and ranking member Michael McCaul stated, "Absent a legitimate reason for this move, which has not been provided, we believe she should be reinstated". 

Widakuswara was reinstated on January 22, 2021.

References 

Year of birth missing (living people)
Living people
American women journalists
American radio reporters and correspondents
Created via preloaddraft
21st-century American women